Saint Heliers is an affluent seaside suburb of Auckland with a population of  as of  This suburb is popular amongst visitors for the beaches, cafés, and views of Rangitoto Island, the distinctive volcanic island in the Hauraki Gulf.

St. Heliers is located at the eastern end of Tamaki Drive, and used to be the place where the Tamaki estuary formally divided Auckland from Manukau City, until the entire Auckland region was amalgamated under a single city authority, the Auckland Council, in 2010. Local government of St. Heliers is the responsibility of the Ōrākei Local Board, which also covers the suburbs of Ōrākei, Kohimarama, Mission Bay, Glendowie, St Johns, Meadowbank, Remuera and Ellerslie.

Demographics

Saint Heliers had a population of 11,529 at the 2018 New Zealand census, an increase of 531 people (4.8%) since the 2013 census, and an increase of 945 people (8.9%) since the 2006 census. There were 4,341 households, comprising 5,475 males and 6,051 females, giving a sex ratio of 0.9 males per female, with 2,091 people (18.1%) aged under 15 years, 1,635 (14.2%) aged 15 to 29, 5,397 (46.8%) aged 30 to 64, and 2,409 (20.9%) aged 65 or older.

Ethnicities were 84.0% European/Pākehā, 4.2% Māori, 1.5% Pacific peoples, 13.9% Asian, and 3.0% other ethnicities. People may identify with more than one ethnicity.

The percentage of people born overseas was 35.8, compared with 27.1% nationally.

Although some people chose not to answer the census's question about religious affiliation, 44.4% had no religion, 44.8% were Christian, 0.1% had Māori religious beliefs, 1.3% were Hindu, 0.5% were Muslim, 1.1% were Buddhist and 2.2% had other religions.

Of those at least 15 years old, 4,260 (45.1%) people had a bachelor's or higher degree, and 606 (6.4%) people had no formal qualifications. 3,621 people (38.4%) earned over $70,000 compared to 17.2% nationally. The employment status of those at least 15 was that 4,560 (48.3%) people were employed full-time, 1,500 (15.9%) were part-time, and 237 (2.5%) were unemployed.

History

Pre-European history 

The area around Glover Park and Achilles Point was named Te Pane o Horoiwi ("The Head of Horoiwi") by Tainui iwi. The name refers to the place where Horoiwi, one of the migrants aboard to Tainui waka, settled with his family in approximately the 13th century. Te Pane o Horoiwi pā was located at the end of The Rise, at the high point of the tuff ring of Whakamuhu / Glover Park, an extinct volcano. Te Waiohua iwi traces its origin to a mingling of the people who first inhabited the area with members of Tainui who settled the area, such as Horoiwi. Around 1750, Ngāti Whātua expanded their territory further into Tāmaki Makaurau, displacing Te Waiohua. Ngāti Whātua gifted the land to Ngāti Pāoa in the late 1700s. The area was abandoned in the 1820s due to raids by Ngāpuhi during the Musket Wars, however people returned to the area by the late 1830s.

European settlement 

The area around Saint Heliers was a part of the Kohimarama Block, which was purchased by the British crown from Ngāti Pāoa in 1841. European settlement began on the north-facing slopes of St. Heliers bay, with the establishment of the Glen Orchard homestead, believed to have been built in the 1850s. The building was recognised as a place of historic, architectural and social significance by Heritage New Zealand in October 2010. This Regency-style residence incorporates Italianate influences, and has a grand and elegant appearance. Glen Orchard is a historic example of a prosperous rural homestead, and is linked to the settlers who comprised Auckland's early elite. It is known as the residence of Lieutenant-General William Taylor (1790–1868), and his son Charles John Taylor, who married into the family of the fourth New Zealand Premier, Alfred Domett. William Taylor was a retired senior officer of the East India Company’s Madras Army.

In 1879 Glen Orchard became Auckland’s first stud farm, managed by Major Walmsley, who suggested the name St. Heliers Bay, supposedly because it reminded him of the fashionable holiday resort Bay of Saint Helier in Jersey, one of Britain’s Channel Islands. In the mid-1880s the homestead became the centre piece of a planned model seaside suburb that was the foundation of present day St. Heliers.

Residential development 
In November 1881 St. Heliers Bay was bought by the St. Heliers and Northcote Land Company. The aim of this company was to make the land available for residential development. The company realised the area would be more attractive for potential future buyers if St. Heliers’ connections to the Auckland's town centre were improved. At that time St Heliers was usually reached by boat, the trip from Auckland taking only 30 minutes, whereas the  land route via Newmarket, Remuera and Meadowbank was usually much more onerous. During this period St Heliers was a centre for local farmers and the location of the villas of a few rich business people. Despite advertisements in The New Zealand Herald, such as the example below, ultimately land sales were poor and the company's scheme failed:

“To visit St. Heliers Bay, formerly Glen Orchard, is to become impressed with the fact that there is no other bay of equal beauty near Auckland. It commands a charming and picturesque view of the North Shore, Rangitoto, Motutapu and Brown’s Island. The beach is so attractive that it cannot fail to be resorted to as a fashionable watering-place. The soil is partly volcanic and is a warm rich loam which, for orchards and floriculture, leaves little to be desired. It will be seen that the land slopes to the north with hills behind as protection from chilly southern winds; therefore the aspect is an especially favourable one for fruit growing and successful gardening. We may fairly say that with regular and frequent communication by means of tramway, or steamer to the new wharf, it requires no stretch of the imagination to believe that that beautiful bay will become the Brighton of Auckland“.

The advertisement indicates the need for better transport links. The St. Heliers and Northcote Land Company built a 460m (1500 foot) pier at St. Heliers in 1882 before becoming insolvent. However, the tramway connection to Auckland was never realized. By 1890 St. Heliers had become a popular waterfront destination for day trippers, with excursions running from Auckland and Thames. Moonlight excursions from Auckland were especially popular. For this particular excursion the Eagle and Osprey boats were used, since they allowed dancing on board.

After Tamaki Drive was opened in 1932, St. Heliers became a commuter suburb and a destination for Sunday drives. The wharf is long gone but there is frequently talk of rebuilding it, whenever Tamaki Drive is gridlocked with traffic.

Landmarks and features

Achilles Point
Achilles Point is regarded as the rocky promontory on the east side of Ladies Bay, but the name can also indicate the whole headland between St. Heliers and the Tamaki River estuary. It offers great views of the Waitematā Harbour, and the Gulf Islands. In 1940 it was named Achilles Point in honour of the New Zealand battleship HMS Achilles and her crew. The Achilles opened fire on the German cruiser Admiral Graf Spee in the South Atlantic on 13 December 1939. In doing so she became the first New Zealand unit to strike a blow at the enemy in World War II, and the first New Zealand warship to take part in a naval battle. This confrontation off Argentina was later called Battle of the River Plate, the first major naval engagement of World War II, during which the Achilles, defeated the Admiral Graf Spee.

Parks 
Dingle Dell Reserve  –  In the 1950s Dingle Dell Reserve was described as the forgotten "Cinderella of Auckland’s Parks" in The New Zealand Herald. Today it is still a peaceful area located in the heart of St. Heliers, where people can enjoy a picnic or bush walk.  The park hosts, amongst others, the native plants kohekohe and tanekaha, which are the results of native plantings undertaken in 1933. Dingle Dell was part of Major Thomas Bunbury's four farms, which he bought in 1842. It became a public reserve in 1930 and is now owned and managed by the Auckland Council.

Glover Park – St Heliers has one relatively unknown volcano, a maar of unknown age. Its crater had formed a swamp by the time European settlers arrived in the area. On the seaward side, a Māori defended settlement  once stood, and the landward side is marked by the water tower at its highest point. The Auckland City Council acquired the land in the 1930s and in 1953 half the area was drained and consolidated. In the same year the Tamaki Ex-Servicemen's Women's Auxiliary planted trees to commemorate the men of the district who had lost their lives during World War I and II. Unfortunately the drainage project of 1953 proved a failure because the area remained unstable and susceptible to flooding. Additional drainage in 1959 made the park safe, and allowed the area to be converted into the sports fields of Glover Park. It is unclear whether the trees that were planted in 1953 are still the same trees present in Glover Park today.

Events 
Weet-Bix Kids TRYathlon Park – New Zealand's first triathlon for children was held at St. Heliers in 1992 and attracted approximately 500 participants. Children compete over distances starting with a 50-metre swim, 4-kilometre cycle and 1-kilometre run. Since 1992 this event has grown considerably with 20,000 children competing in one of the 13 TRYathlons around the country in 2013.

Round The Bays Fun Run – This annual event is the result of the international running boom of the 1970s and 1980s, during which millions of people took up running. The Auckland Round the Bays Fun Run is one of the largest in the world, and was initiated by the Auckland Joggers Club in the early 1970s. The run is 8.4 km long over Tamaki Drive, the flat road following the contours of the Waitematā Harbour, passing Hobson Bay, Okahu Bay, Mission Bay, Kohimarama Beach, and finishing in St. Heliers Bay Reserve. Nowadays it is estimated that between 70,000 and 80,000 runners participate each year.

Education

Both these schools are coeducational. Rolls are as of

Gallery

References

External links 

St. Heliers Bay Village Association Inc.
Ōrākei Local Board
Weet-Bix Kids TRYathlon
Round The Bays Fun Run
Photographs of Saint Heliers held in Auckland Libraries' heritage collections.

Suburbs of Auckland
Maars of New Zealand
Populated places around the Hauraki Gulf / Tīkapa Moana
Ōrākei Local Board Area